Highway is a Nepali Anthological Film produced by Aadi Productions in association with Louverture Films. Highway was officially selected for and screened at the 62nd Berlin International Film Festival. It was critically acclaimed but it did not perform well at the box office.

Plot
Set against the backdrop of the new culture of bandhs (general strikes) that frequently immobilize post-conflict Nepal, Highway explores five different relationship stories that become intertwined during an ill-fated bus journey from eastern Nepal to the capital Kathmandu. While the passengers - each of whom urgently needs to be somewhere else await a resolution to the combustible strike that is blocking the only passable road, the film explores the psychological and spiritual bandhs that many Nepalese contend with.

Cast
 Saugat Malla as Ronit
 Reecha Sharma as Kavita
 Dayahang Rai as Manoj
 Asha Maya Magrati as Radhika
 Shristi Ghimire as Pooja
 Karma Shakya as Abiral
 Rajan Khatiwada as Driver
 Rabindra Mishra as Doctor
 Nirmala Rai as Mahili Gurung
 Eelum Dixit as Pratiek
 Bhumika Shrestha

Soundtrack
The soundtrack of Highway, titled Paplu (Laija Re), was released on Kantipur FM on 26 October 2011. It was composed by Manoj Kumar KC of 1974 AD with lyrics penned by Bhupendra Khadka. Subhani Moktan recorded the song for the film.

References 

2012 films
Nepalese drama films
Films shot in Kathmandu
Films directed by Deepak Rauniyar
Anthology films